Glaubenberg Pass (el. 1540 m) is a high mountain pass in the Emmental Alps between the cantons of Lucerne and Obwalden in Switzerland.

It connects Entlebuch and Sarnen.

See also
 List of highest paved roads in Europe
 List of mountain passes
List of the highest Swiss passes

Mountain passes of the canton of Lucerne
Mountain passes of Switzerland
Mountain passes of the Alps
Mountain passes of Obwalden
Lucerne–Obwalden border
Emmental Alps